The political groups of the European Parliament are the officially recognised political groups consisting of legislators of aligned ideologies in the European Parliament. 

The European Parliament is unique among supranational assemblies in that its members (MEPs) organise themselves into ideological groups, rather than national cleavages. Each political group is assumed to have a set of core principles, and political groups that cannot demonstrate this may be disbanded (see below).

A political group of the EP usually constitutes the formal parliamentary representation of one or more European political parties (Europarty), national political parties, and independent politicians. In contrast to European political parties, it is strictly forbidden for political groups to organise or finance the political campaign during the European elections since this is the exclusive responsibility of the parties.

Status
Working together in groups benefits European political parties: for example, the European Free Alliance (5 MEPs in sixth Parliament) and the European Green Party (37 MEPs in sixth Parliament) have more power by working together in the European Greens–European Free Alliance Group (42 MEPs) than they would have as stand-alone parties, bringing their causes much-needed additional support. Further incentives for co-operating in Groups include financial subsidies from the Parliament and guaranteed seats on committees which are not afforded to Independent MEPs.

For a Group to be formally recognised in the Parliament, it must fulfil the conditions laid down in the relevant European Parliament Rule of Procedure. That Rule lays down the minimum criteria a Group must meet to qualify as a Group. Provided those criteria are met, MEPs can theoretically create any Group they like. This was put to the test when MEPs attempted to create a far-right Group called "Identity, Tradition, Sovereignty" (ITS). This generated controversy and there were concerns about public funds going towards a far-right Group. Attempts to block the formation of ITS were unsuccessful, but ITS were blocked from leading positions on committees, a privilege usually afforded to all Groups.

These events spurred MEPs, mainly from the largest two groups, to approve a rise in the threshold for groups for the 2009–2014 term to a minimum of 25 MEPs from at least seven states. This was opposed by many MEPs, including the Liberal group, for being detrimental to democracy and the two other smallest groups in Parliament, whilst supporters argued that the change made it harder for the far right to claim EU funds whilst still enabling 2.5% of MEPs to form a group.

Internal structure
Groups may be based around a single European political party (e.g. the European People's Party, the Party of European Socialists) or they can include more than one European party as well as national parties and independents (e.g. the Liberal Group).

Each Group appoints a leader, referred to as a "president", "co-ordinator" or "chair". The chairs of each Group meet in the Conference of Presidents to decide what issues will be dealt with at the plenary session of the European Parliament. Groups can table motions for resolutions and table amendments to reports.

Spectrum

Composition of the current (9th) European Parliament

Positions

Social
EUL/NGL and G/EFA were the most left-wing groups, UEN and EDD the most right-wing, and that was mirrored in their attitudes towards taxation, homosexual equality, abortion, euthanasia and controlling migration into the EU. The groups fell into two distinct camps regarding further development of EU authority, with UEN and EDD definitely against and the rest broadly in favor. Opinion was wider on the CFSP, with only PES, ELDR and EPP-ED in favor and the others against. Unsurprisingly, G/EFA was far more in favor of Green issues compared to the other groups.

Attitude to EU tax

Table 1 of an April 2008 discussion paper from the Centre for European Economic Research by Heinemann et al. analysed each Group's stance on a hypothetical generalised EU tax. The results for each Group are given in the adjacent diagram with the horizontal scale scaled so that −100% = totally against and 100% = totally for. The results are also given in the table below, rescaled so that 0% = totally against, 100% = totally for.

G/EFA and PES were in favor of such a tax, IND/DEM and the Independents were definitely against, the others had no clear position.

Analyses
National media focus on the MEPs and national parties of their own member state, neglecting the group's activities and poorly understanding their structure or even existence. Transnational media coverage of the groups per se is limited to those organs such as the Parliament itself, or those news media (e.g. EUObserver or theParliament.com) that specialise in the Parliament. These organs cover the groups in detail but with little overarching analysis. So although such organs make it easy to find out how a group acted on a specific vote, they provide little information on the voting patterns of a specific group. As a result, the only bodies providing analysis of the voting patterns and Weltanschauung of the groups are academics. Academics analysing the European political groups include Simon Hix (London School of Economics and Political Science), Amie Kreppel University of Florida, Abdul Noury (Free University of Brussels), Gérard Roland, (University of California, Berkeley), Gail McElroy (Trinity College Dublin, Department of Political Science), Kenneth Benoit (Trinity College Dublin – Institute for International Integration Studies (IIIS)), Friedrich Heinemann, Philipp Mohl, and Steffen Osterloh (University of Mannheim – Centre for European Economic Research).

Groups cohesion

Cohesion is the term used to define whether a Group is united or divided amongst itself. Figure 1 of a 2002 paper from European Integration online Papers (EIoP) by Thorsten Faas analysed the Groups as they stood in 2002. 
The results for each Group are given in the adjacent diagram with the horizontal scale scaled so that 0% = totally split, 100% = totally united. The results are also given in the table below.

G/EFA, PES and ELDR were the most united groups, with EDD the most disunited.

Proportion of female MEPs

The March 2006 edition of "Social Europe: the journal of the European Left" included a chapter called "Women and Social Democratic Politics" by Wendy Stokes. That chapter gave the proportion of female MEPs in each Group in the European Parliament. The results for each Group are given in the adjacent diagram. The horizontal scale denotes gender balance (0% = totally male, 100% = totally female, but no Group has a female majority, so the scale stops at 50%). The results are also given in the table below.

G/EFA, PES and ALDE were the most balanced groups in terms of gender, with IND/DEM the most unbalanced.

Party relations
The Parliament does not form a government in the traditional sense and its politics have developed over consensual rather than adversarial lines as a form of consociationalism. No single group has ever held a majority in Parliament. Historically, the two largest parliamentary formations have been the EPP Group and the PES Group, which are affiliated to their respective European political parties, the European People's Party (EPP) and the Party of European Socialists (PES). These two Groups have dominated the Parliament for much of its life, continuously holding between 50 and 70 percent of the seats together. The PES were the largest single party grouping up to 1999, when they were overtaken by the centre-right EPP.

In 1987 the Single European Act came into force and, under the new cooperation procedure, the Parliament needed to obtain large majorities to make the most impact. So the EPP and PES came to an agreement to co-operate in the Parliament. This agreement became known as the "grand coalition" and, aside from a break in the fifth Parliament, it has dominated the Parliament for much of its life, regardless of necessity. The grand coalition is visible in the agreement between the two Groups to divide the five-year term of the President of the European Parliament equally between them, with an EPP president for half the term and a PES president for the other half, regardless of the actual election result.

Group cooperation
Table 3 of 21 August 2008 version of working paper by Hix and Noury gave figures for the level of cooperation between each group (how many times they vote with a group, and how many times they vote against) for the Fifth and Sixth Parliaments. The results are given in the tables below, where 0% = never votes with, 100% = always votes with.

EUL/NGL and G/EFA voted closely together, as did PES and ALDE, and EPP-ED and UEN. Surprisingly, given that PES and EPP-ED are partners in the Grand Coalition, they were not each other's closest allies, although they did vote with each other about two-thirds of the time. IND/DEM did not have close allies within the political groups, preferring instead to cooperate most closely with the Non-Inscrits.

Breaking coalitions
During the fifth term the ELDR Group were involved in a break in the grand coalition when they entered into an alliance with the European People's Party, to the exclusion of the Party of European Socialists. This was reflected in the Presidency of the Parliament with the terms being shared between the EPP and the ELDR, rather than the EPP and PES as before.

However ELDR intervention was not the only cause for a break in the grand coalition. There have been specific occasions where real left-right party politics have emerged, notably the resignation of the Santer Commission. When the initial allegations against the Commission Budget emerged, they were directed primarily against the PES Édith Cresson and Manuel Marín. PES supported the commission and saw the issue as an attempt by the EPP to discredit their party ahead of the 1999 elections. EPP disagreed. Whilst the Parliament was considering rejecting the Community budget, President Jacques Santer argued that a "No" vote would be tantamount to a vote of no confidence. PES leader Pauline Green MEP attempted a vote of confidence and the EPP put forward counter motions. During this period the two Groups adopted a government-opposition dynamic, with PES supporting the executive and EPP renouncing its previous coalition support and voting it down.

In 2004 there was another notable break in the grand coalition. It occurred over the nomination of Rocco Buttiglione as European Commissioner for Justice, Freedom and Security. The EPP supported the appointment of Buttiglione, while the PES, who were also critics of the President-designate Jose Manuel Barroso, led the parties seeking Buttiglione's removal following his rejection (the first in EU history) by a Parliamentary committee. Barroso initially stood by his team and offered only small concessions, which were rejected by the PES. The EPP demanded that if Buttiglione were to go, then a PES commissioner must also be sacrificed for balance. In the end, Italy withdrew Buttiglione and put forward Franco Frattini instead. Frattini won the support of the PES and the Barroso Commission was finally approved, albeit behind schedule. Politicisation such as the above has been increasing, with Simon Hix of the London School of Economics noting in 2007 that

The dynamical coalitions in the European Parliament show year to year changes.

Group switching
Party group switching in the European Parliament is the phenomenon where parliamentarians individually or collectively switch from one party group to the other. The phenomenon of EP party group switching is a well-known contributor to the volatility of the EP party system and highlights the fluidity that characterizes the composition of European political groups. On average 9% of MEPs switch during legislative terms. Party group switching is a phenomenon that gained force especially in the legislatures during the 1990s, up to a maximum of 18% for the 1989–1994 term, with strong prevalence among representatives from France and Italy, though by no means limited to those two countries. There is a clear tendency of party group switches from the ideological extremes, both left and right, toward the center. Most switching takes place at the outset of legislative terms, with another peak around the half-term moment, when responsibilities rotate within the EP hierarchy.

History

The political groups of the European Parliament have been around in one form or another since September 1952 and the first meeting of the Parliament's predecessor, the Common Assembly. The groups are coalitions of MEPs and the European parties and national parties that those MEPs belong to. The groups have coalesced into representations of the dominant schools of European political thought and are the primary actors in the Parliament.

The first three Groups were established in the earliest days of the Parliament. They were the "Socialist Group" (which eventually became the S&D group), the "Christian Democrat Group" (later EPP group) and the "Liberals and Allies Group" (later ALDE group).

As the Parliament developed, other Groups emerged. Gaullists from France founded the European Democratic Union Group. When Conservatives from Denmark and the United Kingdom joined, they created the European Conservatives Group, which (after some name changes) eventually merged with the Group of the European People's Party.

The 1979 first direct election established further groups and the establishment of European political parties such as the European People's Party.

Compositions of past European Parliaments

5th European Parliament

6th European Parliament 

The mandate of previous European Parliament ran from 2004 and 2009. It was composed of the following political groups.

Table 3 of the 3 January 2008 version of a working paper from the London School of Economics/Free University of Brussels by Hix and Noury considered the positions of the groups in the Sixth Parliament (2004–2009) by analysing their roll-call votes. The results for each group are shown in the adjacent diagram. The vertical scale is anti-pro Europe spectrum, (0% = extremely anti-Europe, 100% = extremely pro), and the horizontal scale is economic left-right spectrum, (0% = extremely economically left-wing, 100% = extremely economically right-wing). The results are also shown in the table below.

Two of the groups (EPP-ED and IND/DEM) were split. EPP-ED are split on Euroscepticism: the EPP subgroup were centre-right Europhiles, whereas the ED subgroup were right-wing Eurosceptics.

IND/DEM was also split along its subgroups: the reformist subgroup (bottom-center) voted as centrist Eurosceptics, and the secessionist subgroup (middle-right) voted as right-wing Euroneutrals. The reformist subgroup was able to pursue a reformist agenda via the Parliament. The secessionist subgroup was unable to pursue a secessionist agenda there (it's out of the Parliament's purview) and pursued a right-wing agenda instead. This resulted in the secessionist subgroup being less eurosceptic in terms of roll-call votes than other, non-eurosceptic parties. UKIP (the major component of the secessionist subgroup) was criticised for this seeming abandonment of its Eurosceptic core principles.

Table 2 of a 2005 discussion paper from the Institute for International Integration Studies by Gail McElroy and Kenneth Benoit analysed the group positions between April and June 2004, at the end of the Fifth Parliament and immediately before the 2004 elections. The results are given below, with 0% = extremely against, 100% = extremely for (except for the left-right spectrum, where 0% = extremely left-wing, 100% = extremely right-wing)

7th European Parliament

8th European Parliament 

Major changes compared to the period 2004–2009 are:
 The formation of a new political group, the European Conservatives and Reformists (ECR). This conservative, Eurosceptic group is headed by 26 MEPs from the UK's Conservative Party.
 The Eurosceptic Independence/Democracy (IND/DEM) and Union for Europe of the Nations (UEN) groups suffered heavy losses in the election. On their own they no longer had enough MEPs to form a separate group. MEPs formerly from these groups formed the Europe of Freedom and Democracy (EFD) group on 1 July 2009.
 The centre-right European People's Party now formed its own political group in its entirety, as the former members of the European Democrats left the group to join the ECR.
 The political group of the Party of European Socialists renamed itself to the Progressive Alliance of Socialists and Democrats or Socialists and Democrats (S&D) to accommodate the Democratic Party of Italy. The Democratic Party did not become member of the Party of European Socialists until February 2014.

History according to group
Some of the groups (such as the PES and S&D Group) have become homogeneous units coterminous with their European political party, some (such as IND/DEM) have not. But they are still coalitions, not parties in their own right, and do not issue manifestos of their own. It may therefore be difficult to discern how the groups intend to vote without first inspecting the party platforms of their constituent parties, and then with limited certainty.

Christian democrats and conservatives
In European politics, the centre-right is usually occupied by Christian democrats and conservatives. These two ideological strands have had a tangled relationship in the Parliament. The first Christian Democrat Group was founded in 1953 and stayed with that name for a quarter of a century. Meanwhile, outside the Parliament, local Christian-democratic parties were organising and eventually formed the pan-national political party called the "European People's Party" on 29 April 1976. Since all the Christian-democratic MEPs were members of this pan-European party, the Group's name was changed to indicate this: first to the "Christian-Democratic Group (Group of the European People's Party)" on 14 March 1978, then to "Group of the European People's Party (Christian Democrats)" on 17 July 1979. Meanwhile, on 16 January 1973, the "European Conservative Group" was formed by the British and Danish Conservative parties, which had recently joined the EEC. This group was renamed to the "European Democratic Group" on 17 July 1979. The EPP Group grew during the 1980s, with conservative parties such as New Democracy of Greece and the People's Party of Spain joining the Group. In contrast, the number of MEPs in the European Democratic Group fell over the same period and it eventually merged with the EPP Group on 1 May 1992. This consolidation of the centre-right continued during the 1990s, with MEPs from the Italian centre-right party Forza Italia being admitted into the EPP Group on 15 June 1998, after spending nearly a year (19 July 1994 to 6 July 1995) in their own Group, self-referentially called "Forza Europa", and nearly three years (6 July 1995 to 15 June 1998) in the national-conservative Group called "Union for Europe". But the Conservatives were growing restless and on 20 July 1999 the EPP Group was renamed to the "Group of the European People's Party (Christian Democrats) and European Democrats" (EPP-ED) to identify the Conservative parties within the Group. The Group remained under that name until after the 2009 European elections, when it reverted to the title "Group of the European People's Party (Christian Democrats)" upon the exit of the European Democrats subgroup and the formation of the "European Conservatives and Reformists" group in June 2009.

Social democrats
In western Europe, social-democratic parties have been the dominant centre-left force since the dawn of modern European cooperation. The Socialist Group was one of the first Groups to be founded when it was created on 23 June 1953 in the European Parliament's predecessor, the Common Assembly of the European Coal and Steel Community, and continued through the creation of the appointed Parliament in 1958 and the elected Parliament in 1979. Meanwhile, the national parties making up the Group were also organising themselves on a European level outside the Parliament, with the parties creating the "Confederation of Socialist Parties of the European Community" in 1974 and its successor, the "Party of European Socialists", in 1992. As a result, the Group (which had kept its "Socialist Group" name all along) was renamed to the "Group of the Party of European Socialists" on 21 April 1993 and it became difficult to distinguish between the Party of European Socialists party and the political group. The Group reverted to (approximately) its former name of the "Socialist Group in the European Parliament". on 20 July 2004 Despite all this, the Group was still universally referred to as "PES", notwithstanding the 2009 name change to the "Progressive Alliance of Socialists and Democrats" to accommodate the Democratic Party of Italy.

Liberals and centrists
In European politics, liberalism tends to be associated with ideas inspired by classical and economic liberalism, which advocates limited government intervention in society. However, the Liberal Group contains diverse parties, including conservative-liberal, social-liberal and Nordic agrarian parties. It has previously been home to parties such as the minor French Gaullist party Union for the New Republic and the Social Democratic Party of Portugal, which were not explicitly liberal parties, but who were not aligned with either the Socialist or the Christian Democratic Groups. The Liberal Group was founded on 23 June 1953 under the name of the "Group of Liberals and Allies". As the Parliament grew, it changed its name to the "Liberal and Democratic Group" (1976), then to the "Liberal and Democratic Reformist Group" (13 December 1985), then to the "Group of the European Liberal Democrat and Reform Party" (19 July 1994) before settling on the name of the "Group of the Alliance of Liberals and Democrats for Europe" on 20 July 2004, when the Group was joined by the centrist parties that formed the European Democratic Party.

ELDR Group leader Graham Watson MEP denounced the grand coalition in 2007 and expressed a desire to ensure that the posts of Commission President, Council President, Parliament President and High Representative were not divided based on agreement between the two largest groups to the exclusion of third parties.

Between 1994 and 1999 there was a separate "European Radical Alliance", which consisted of MEPs of the French Energie Radicale, the Italian Bonino List, and regionalists aligned with the European Free Alliance.

The current name as of 2020 is "Renew Europe".

Eurosceptic conservatives
Parties from certain European countries have been unwilling to join the centre-right European People's Party Group. These parties generally have a liberal conservative but eurosceptic agenda. The first such Group was formed when the French Gaullists split from the Liberal Group on 21 January 1965 and created a new Group called the "European Democratic Union" (not to be confused with the association of conservative and Christian-democratic parties founded in 1978 called the European Democrat Union nor the Conservative Group called the "European Democratic Group" founded in 1979). The Group was renamed on 16 January 1973 to the "Group of European Progressive Democrats" when the Gaullists were joined by the Irish Fianna Fáil and Scottish National Party, and renamed itself again on 24 July 1984 to the "Group of the European Democratic Alliance". The European Democratic Alliance joined with MEPs from Forza Italia to become the "Union for Europe" on 6 July 1995, but it didn't last and the Forza Italia MEPs left on 15 June 1998 to join the EPP, leaving Union for Europe to struggle on until it split on 20 July 1999. The French Rally for the Republic members joined the EPP, but Fianna Fáil and the Portuguese CDS–PP members joined a new group called the "Union for Europe of the Nations". After the 2009 Parliament elections the Union for Europe of Nations was disbanded due to a lack of members, with the remaining members splitting into factions, with some joining with the remaining members of Independence/Democracy to form Europe of Freedom and Democracy, a new Eurosceptic group, and the remaining members joining with the former members of the European Democrat subgroup of the EPP-ED to form the European Conservatives and Reformists.

Greens and regionalists
In European politics, there has been a coalition between the greens and the stateless nationalists or regionalists (who also support devolution). In 1984 Greens and regionalists gathered into the "Rainbow Group", a coalition of Greens, regionalists and other parties of the left unaffiliated with any of the international organisations. In 1989, the group split: the Greens went off to form the "Green Group", whilst the regionalists stayed in Rainbow. Rainbow collapsed in 1994 and its members joined the "European Radical Alliance" under the French Energie Radicale. The Greens and regionalists stayed separate until 1999, when they reunited under the "Greens/European Free Alliance" banner.

Communists and socialists
The first communist group in the European Parliament was the "Communist and Allies Group" founded on 16 October 1973. It stayed together until 25 July 1989 when it split into two groups, the "Left Unity" Group with 14 members and the "Group of the European United Left" (EUL) with 28 members. EUL collapsed in January 1993 after the Italian Communist Party became the Democratic Party of the Left and its MEPs joined the PES Group, leaving Left Unity as the only leftist group before the 1994 elections. The name was resurrected immediately after the elections when the "Confederal Group of the European United Left" was formed on 19 July 1994. On 6 January 1995, when parties from Sweden and Finland joined, the Group was further renamed to the "Confederal Group of the European United Left–Nordic Green Left" and it has stayed that way to the present.

Far-right nationalists
In European politics, a grouping of nationalists has thus far found it difficult to cohere in a continuous Group. The first nationalist Group was founded by the French National Front and the Italian Social Movement in 1984 under the name of the "Group of the European Right", and it lasted until 1989. Its successor, the "Technical Group of the European Right", existed from 1989 to 1994. There was then a gap of thirteen years until "Identity, Tradition, Sovereignty" was founded on 15 January 2007, which lasted for nearly eleven months until it fell apart on 14 November 2007 due to in-fighting.

A new radical right group was formed during the 8th parliament on 16 June 2015 under the name "Europe of Nations and Freedom".

Eurosceptics
The school of political thought that states that the competences of the European Union should be reduced or prevented from expanding further, is represented in the European Parliament by the eurosceptics. The first Eurosceptic group in the European Parliament was founded on 19 July 1994. It was called the "European Nations Group" and it lasted until 10 November 1996. Its successor was the "Group of Independents for a Europe of Nations", founded on 20 December 1996. Following the 1999 European elections, the Group was reorganised into the "Group for a Europe of Democracies and Diversities" on 20 July 1999, and similarly reorganised after the 2004 election into the "Independence/Democracy Group" on 20 July 2004. The group's leaders were Nigel Farage (UKIP) and Kathy Sinnott (Independent, Ireland). After the 2009 European elections a significant proportion of the IND/DEM members joined the "Europe of Freedom and Democracy", which included parties formerly part of the Union for a Europe of Nations. The EFD group's leaders were Farage and Francesco Speroni of the Lega Nord (Italy). With significant changes in membership after the 2014 European elections, the group was re-formed as "Europe of Freedom and Direct Democracy", led by Farage and David Borrelli (Five Star Movement, Italy).

Heterogeneous
A Group is assumed to have a set of core principles ("affinities" or "complexion") to which the full members are expected to adhere. This throws up an anomaly: Groups get money and seats on Committees which Independent members do not get, but the total number of Independent members may be greater than the members of the smaller Groups. In 1979, MEPs got round this by forming a technical group (formally called the "Group for the Technical Coordination and Defence of Independent Groups and Members", or "CDI" for short) as a coalition of parties ranging from centre-left to far-left, which were not aligned with any of the major international organizations. CDI lasted until 1984. On 20 July 1999, another technical group was formed, (formally called the "Technical Group of Independent Members – mixed group" or "TGI" for short). Since it contained far-right MEPs and centre-left MEPs, it could not possibly be depicted as having a common outlook. The Committee on Constitutional Affairs ruled that TGI did not have a coherent political complexion, Parliament upheld (412 to 56 with 36 abstentions) the ruling, and TGI was thus disbanded on 13 September 1999, the first Group to be forcibly dissolved. However, the ruling was appealed to the European Court of First Instance and the Group was temporarily resurrected on 1 December 1999 until the Court came to a decision. On 3 October 2001, president Fontaine announced that the Court of First Instance had declared against the appeal and that the disbandment was back in effect from 2 October 2001, the date of the declaration. TGI appeared on the list of Political Groups in the European Parliament for the last time on 4 October 2001. Since then the requirement that Groups have a coherent political complexion has been enforced (as ITS later found out), and "mixed" Groups are not expected to appear again.

Independents
Independent MEPs that are not in a Group are categorised as "Non-Inscrits" (the French term is universally used, even in English translations). This non-Group has no Group privileges or funding, and is included here solely for completeness.

Development of Political Groups in the European ParliamentPolitical groups in the European Parliament (1979)"European Union: Power and Policy-Making" second edition,  Published 2001 by Routledge, edited by Jeremy John Richardson, Chapter 6 "Parliaments and policy-making in the European Union", esp. page 125, "Table 6.2 Party Groups in the European Parliament, 1979–2000"Searchlight article on collapse of ER

See also
 Apportionment in the European Parliament
 European Party for Individual Liberty
 Political organisations at European Union level

References

External links
 8values political quiz
 see how European Political Groups vote and how they form coalitions on various policy areas
 European Parliament political groups
 Lists of MEPs by political group
 The Party System of the European Parliament: Collusive or Competitive? (includes groups and how they evolved since 1952/3)
 The European Parliament and Supranational Party System Cambridge University Press 2002
 Party Groups and Policy Positions in the European Parliament
 Josep M. Colomer.  "How Political Parties, Rather than Member-States, Are Building the European Union" (proof copy), (via Google Books) in Widening the European Union: The Politics of Institutional Change, ed. Bernard Steunenberg. London: Routledge, 2002, .

 
Political science
Politics of Europe